South West Tasmania is a region in Tasmania that has evoked curiosity as to its resources over the duration of European presence on the island.

The more recent is the consideration as a potential area of resources for development and its consideration as World Heritage wilderness.

The most notable controversies occurring in the region in the late twentieth century was the flooding of Lake Pedder and the proposed damming of the Franklin River by the Franklin Dam.

Southwest is a locality that covers most of the region. The locality (and therefore the region) is in the local government areas of Derwent Valley (29%), Huon Valley (20%), Central Highlands (7%) and West Coast (44%). The 2016 census has a population of 15 for the state suburb of Southwest.

Early surveys
Most early walks through the region were for discovery, or in the case of Thomas Bather Moore was to establish tracks for access.

In 1927, a walk through the area between Cox Bight and Bathurst Harbour even included the then governor of the state, Sir James O'Grady, and its intention was a search for geological information.

Locality boundaries
The Southern Ocean forms the western and southern boundaries. The locality encircles Strathgordon, and is adjoined by the localities of Macquarie Heads, Strahan, West Coast, Queenstown, Gormanston, Lake St Clair, Derwent Bridge, Butlers Gorge, Tarraleah, Wayatinah, Florentine, Maydena, Styx, Lonnavale, Geeveston, Raminea, Strathblane, Hastings, Lune River, and Recherche.

Road infrastructure
The A10 route (Lyell Highway) enters from Derwent Bridge in the north-east and runs generally north-west until it reaches the north-western boundary, where it exits to Queenstown. Route B61 (Gordon River Road) enters from Maydena in the east and runs generally west through Strathgordon to the Gordon Dam, where it ends. Route C607 (Scotts Peak Dam Road) starts at an intersection with B61 and runs south and west to Scotts Peak Dam, where it ends.

South West Advisory Committee
Members were Sir George B Cartland, G. J. Foot and A. G. Ogilvie. 
Submissions were received on its subject area.
It made a preliminary report in May 1976, and a final report in August 1978.

South West Tasmania Resources Survey

Following national and international concern over the fate of South West Tasmania, Commonwealth Government funded the survey with the States Grants (Nature Conservation Act) Act of 1974. Further funding was provided from the Environment (Financial Assistance) Act of 1977.

The South West Tasmania Resources Survey produced 25 Discussion Papers, 22 Working Papers and 20 Occasional papers - including the breakup of the region into river catchments:

 Franklin River
 Picton River
 Huon Weld
 Lake Gordon–Lake Pedder
 Lower Gordon
 Macquarie Harbour
 King River
 Mackintosh-Murchison
 Wanderer and Giblin
 Davey River
 Bathurst Harbour
 New River and South Coast

National inventory
Ten years after the South West Resources survey the Australia Heritage Commission published an inventory for the South West.

See also

 South West Wilderness
 Regions of Tasmania
 Melaleuca

References

Further reading